The Eliphalet Spurr House is a historic house located at 103 Walnut Street in Brookline, Massachusetts, United States.

Description and history 
The -story wood-frame house was built in 1798 by Eliphalet Spurr, who was locally prominent as one of the first operators of a local coach service, providing transport to Boston (which then required a roundabout trip via Roxbury and the Boston Neck). It is the oldest building in the Pill Hill, and one of the town's few 18th century Georgian houses.

The house was listed on the National Register of Historic Places on October 17, 1985.

See also
National Register of Historic Places listings in Brookline, Massachusetts

References

Houses completed in 1798
Georgian architecture in Massachusetts
Houses in Brookline, Massachusetts
National Register of Historic Places in Brookline, Massachusetts
Houses on the National Register of Historic Places in Norfolk County, Massachusetts